The Men's Open International de Squash de Nantes 2016 is the men's edition of the 2016 Open International de Squash de Nantes, which is a tournament of the PSA World Tour event International (Prize money: $25,000). The event took place at La Cité International des Congrès in Nantes in France from 7 to 11 of September. Grégoire Marche won his second Open International de Nantes trophy, beating Chris Simpson in the final.

Prize money and ranking points
For 2016, the prize purse was $25,000. The prize money and points breakdown is as follows:

Seeds

Draw and results

See also
Women's Open International de Squash de Nantes 2016
Open International de Squash de Nantes
2016 PSA World Tour

References

External links
PSA Open International de Squash de Nantes 2016 website
Open International de Squash de Nantes official website

2016 in French sport
2016 in squash
Open international de squash de Nantes